Crystal Nix-Hines (born 1963) served as the United States Permanent Representative to the United Nations Educational, Scientific, and Cultural Organization (UNESCO) with the rank of Ambassador between July 2014 and January 2017.

Early life and education

Crystal Nix grew up in Wilmington, Delaware, where her father, Theophilus R. Nix Sr., was the second African-American attorney admitted to the Delaware bar, and her mother, Dr. Lulu Mae Nix, founded social service organizations. She attended the Wilmington Friends School, along with her sister and two brothers, one of whom is corporate counsel at DuPont Corporation.

In 1985, Nix-Hines was graduated from Princeton University, where she was a classmate of Michelle Robinson Obama and the editor-in-chief of The Daily Princetonian. From 2006 she served for nine years on Princeton's Board of Trustees. In 1990, she graduated from Harvard Law School, where she served as an editor of the Harvard Law Review with Barack Obama.

Career

Following law school, she clerked for Judge William A. Norris of the Ninth Circuit Court of Appeals from 1990 to 1991. From 1991 to 1992, she clerked for Justices Thurgood Marshall and Sandra Day O’Connor of the U.S. Supreme Court.

During her legal career, Nix-Hines has worked at Quinn Emanuel Urquhart & Sullivan, Fairbank & Vincent and O’Melveny & Myers, LLP. She also served as Assistant to the General Counsel/Senior Vice President of Capital Cities/ABC, Inc. and held several positions at the State Department, including Counselor to the Assistant Secretary for Democracy, Human Rights and Labor, member of the Department's Policy Planning Staff, and Special Assistant to the Legal Adviser.

Nix-Hines has also worked as a writer and producer on several network television shows such as Commander-in-Chief, Alias, and The Practice. She began her career as a reporter for The New York Times (in his memoir The Times of My Life and My Life at the Times, former Times executive editor Max Frankel wrote that in leaving journalism for law, Ms. Nix had “left a promising reporting career.”)

UNESCO Ambassador

On July 9, 2013, Nix-Hines was nominated by President Obama to the position of United States Permanent Representative to the United Nations Educational, Scientific and Cultural Organization (UNESCO) with the rank of ambassador. Nix-Hines was confirmed by the U.S. Senate on June 12, 2014, and sworn into office on July 16, 2014. During her tenure, she and her husband, David Hines, resided in Paris, France. In January 2017, at the end of Obama's term, she stepped down from the post.

See also 
 List of law clerks of the Supreme Court of the United States (Seat 8)
 List of law clerks of the Supreme Court of the United States (Seat 10)

References

External links 

 
 Crystal Nix-Hines at the U.S. Department of State Office of the Historian

1963 births
Living people
American lawyers
Television producers from New York City
American women television producers
American women lawyers
Harvard Law School alumni
Law clerks of the Supreme Court of the United States
Permanent Delegates of the United States to UNESCO
People from Wilmington, Delaware
Princeton University alumni
Quinn Emanuel Urquhart & Sullivan people
The New York Times writers
American women television writers
American television writers
American women ambassadors
African-American diplomats
Screenwriters from New York (state)
Screenwriters from Delaware
21st-century African-American people
21st-century African-American women
20th-century African-American people
20th-century African-American women